
Gmina Troszyn is a rural gmina (administrative district) in Ostrołęka County, Masovian Voivodeship, in east-central Poland.

Villages
Gmina Troszyn contains the villages and settlements of Aleksandrowo, Borowce, Budne, Choromany, Chrostowo, Chrzczony, Dąbek, Dzbenin, Grucele, Janochy, Kamionowo, Kleczkowo, Kurpie Dworskie, Kurpie Szlacheckie, Łątczyn Szlachecki, Łątczyn Włościański, Mieczki-Abramy, Mieczki-Poziemaki, Mieczki-Ziemaki, Milewo Wielkie, Milewo-Łosie, Milewo-Tosie, Ojcewo, Opęchowo, Puchały, Rabędy, Radgoszcz, Repki, Rostki, Sawały, Siemiątkowo, Stare Janki, Troszyn, Trzaski, Wysocarz, Zamość, Zapieczne, Zawady, Żmijewo-Zagroby, Żmijówek Włościański, Żmijówek-Mans and Żyźniewo.

Neighbouring gminas
Gmina Troszyn is bordered by the gminas of Czerwin, Miastkowo, Rzekuń and Śniadowo.

References

Polish official population figures 2006

Troszyn
Ostrołęka County